The Central House of Artists, Moscow (Tsentralny Dom Khudozhnika) is a four storey art gallery in Moscow. It was built by the Artists' Union of the USSR.

References

Art museums and galleries in Moscow